Murdu (also Romanized as Mūrdū) is a village in Khamir Rural District, in the Central District of Khamir County, Hormozgan Province, Iran. At the 2006 census, its population was 29, in 8 families.

References 

Populated places in Khamir County